Anthim the Iberian (Romanian: Antim Ivireanul, Georgian: ანთიმოზ ივერიელი – Antimoz Iverieli; secular name: Andria; 1650 — September or October 1716) was a Georgian theologian, scholar, calligrapher, philosopher and one of the greatest ecclesiastic figures of Wallachia, led the printing press of the prince of Wallachia, and was Metropolitan of Bucharest in 1708–1715.

Early life

Anthim was born in the Kingdom of Kartli, a Georgian kingdom then known as Iberia in the west. Anthim was taken prisoner by Ottoman troops, and sold in the slave market at Constantinople. He was trained as an artisan, learning wood sculpting, painting, embroidery, and calligraphy. At some point he was ransomed by the Patriarch of Constantinople. He took orders in Istanbul, while living on the compounds of the Patriarchate.  Patriarch Dositheos traveled to Iași, taking Anthim with him. A Greek printing office had been established there in 1682.

In Wallachia
In 1689 he was asked to settle in Wallachia by Prince Constantin Brâncoveanu, and in 1691 was given charge of the newly founded printing press in Bucharest. In 1693, he published the Gospels in Romanian. In 1695, being appointed father superior (egumen) of the Snagov Monastery, and established a printing office at the new location.

Anthim spoke and wrote Greek, Turkish, and Arabic. He soon acquired a thorough knowledge of Romanian, and was instrumental in helping to introduce that language into the local church as its official language. In 1702 he returned to Bucharest.

He became bishop of Râmnic in 1705, and in 1708 Metropolitan of Wallachia.

In 1709 Anthim was a founder of the first Georgian printing press in Tbilisi; he also trained Georgians in the art of printing, and cut the type with which under his pupil Mihai Iștvanovici printed the first Georgian Gospels (1710). He also printed a short catechism to assist his priests in giving catechetical instruction. In addition, Anthim published 25 other books in Romanian, as well as Church Slavonic, Greek, and Arabic (usually in bilingual volumes, such as the Greek-Arabic Missal of 1702); this meant that he was also the first in Wallachia to use Arabic fonts.

His homiletic work, the Didache, was a collection of sermons meant as a sharp critique of contemporary habits and morals; notably, beside Christian sources, Anthim made reference to classical philosophy. Alongside his literary output, the cleric was the builder of the All-Saints Monastery in Bucharest, now known as the Antim Monastery in his memory.

Death
Anthim's overt opposition to Ottoman tutelage over Wallachia made him an adversary of the Phanariote regime. The new Prince Nicholas Mavrocordatos imprisoned him, and subsequently exiled him to Mount Sinai. Anthim was captured by the Ottomans while making the trip, and assassinated somewhere in modern-day Bulgaria (his body would have been discarded in the Maritsa or the Tundzha). It is alleged that his murder was ordered by Mavrocordatos himself.

Canonisation
In 1992 Anthim was canonised by the Romanian Orthodox Church having his saint day on September 27. In memory of 300 years of his death, Romanian Orthodox Church declared 2016 as Saint Anthim the Iverian year.

Legacy
In the modern day, Anthim represents a symbol of the relations between Georgia and Romania.

A rugby union trophy, the Antim Cup, contested between Romania and Georgia every year, is named after him.

References

Sources
 "Antimoz Iverieli", in Sakartvelo Encyclopedia, Vol. I, Tbilisi, 1997, p. 158
 Otar Gvinchidze, Antimoz Iverieli, Tbilisi, 1973
 George Călinescu, Istoria literaturii române București, 1968, p. 19

External links
 Didahii (online transcript)

1650 births
1716 deaths
Saints of Georgia (country)
Eastern Orthodox Christians from Georgia (country)
Early Modern Romanian writers
Romanian Orthodox metropolitan bishops
Romanian printers
Romanian saints
Eastern Orthodox Christians from Romania
Assassinated religious leaders
18th-century Christian saints
17th-century Romanian people
18th-century Romanian people
Romanian people of Georgian descent
Christian saints killed by Muslims
Calligraphers from Georgia (country)
Founders of Christian monasteries
Georgia (country)–Romania relations